The Lancashire Union Railway ran between Blackburn and St Helens in Lancashire, England. It was built primarily to carry goods between Blackburn and Garston Dock on the River Mersey, and also to serve collieries in the Wigan area. Most of the line has now closed, except for the St Helens-to-Wigan section that forms part of the main line between Liverpool and the North.

History

The Lancashire Union Railway (LUR) was authorised by Parliamentary Act of 25 July 1864 to build a line from the Blackbrook branch of the St Helens Railway to Adlington on the Bolton-to-Preston line of the Lancashire and Yorkshire Railway (LYR) near Chorley.

The whole line between St Helens and Blackburn opened to passengers on 1 December 1869. Most passenger services were local between Blackburn and Wigan. LNWR trains travelled to the station later known as  via Chorley and Boar's Head, but LYR trains used an alternative route between Chorley and the station later to become  via .

The LUR also built a line, the "Whelley Loop", that bypassed Wigan to the east. It opened in 1869, mainly for freight. Additional connections were made to the NUR's West Coast Main Line north and south of Wigan in 1882 and 1886 respectively, and to other lines radiating from Wigan, thus allowing many trains to bypass Wigan.

The LUR company was vested jointly between the LNWR and LYR from 16 July 1883, until the two parent companies merged on 1 January 1922.

The Blackburn-to-Chorley line closed to passengers on 4 January 1960 and to goods in 1966, although a short section between Cherry Tree and  continued until 1968. The Chorley-to-Wigan line also closed to passengers in 1960, and to goods on 25 May 1971. The Whelley Loop survived until 1976. The Wigan-to-St Helens section is still in use as part of the Liverpool to Wigan Line.

Route

The line began at Blackburn and followed the East Lancashire Line to Cherry Tree where the line branched to Feniscowles; there remnants of the bridge that carried the railway over the A6062 Livesey Branch Road can clearly be seen. From there the line is more or less undeveloped except that gravel and rails are missing; the line carries on where the M65 motorway is now, towards .

The line between Withnell and Brinscall now forms Railway Park. Leaving Brinscall the line ran parallel to Lodge Bank Road and has been built on. At Brinscall Hall there is an old bridge carrying the railway over a footpath which is still intact. The line of the railway is still evident as it passes Wheelton Plantation towards Heapey. Before Heapey the line passes the former ROF Heapey site where there were sidings serving the plant. Heapey Station is now a private residence. The line had another siding which intersected two of the Heapey reservoirs before serving the Heapey Bleachworks; half of the bridge carrying the line over Higher House Lane to the works is still in situ. The line continued under a bridge under Tithe Barn Lane toward the Blackburn–Chorley road (again under an existing bridge) towards the arched viaduct at Botany Bay which carried the line over the Leeds and Liverpool Canal towards Chorley. The viaduct was demolished in 1968 to make way for the M61 motorway.

The line continued past the North Gate estate and past the rear of St. Joseph's Church where it crossed Highfield Road and ran parallel to the Manchester to Preston Line on an embankment (now a footpath). The line headed towards where Friday Street car park now stands where it merged with the main line and entered Chorley station. The LUR uses the main line to Adlington where the line branched off and under the A6 along the Leeds-Liverpool Canal and on to White Bear Station. On leaving the station the line continued parallel to the canal bypassing the town of Blackrod to the east.

The line followed the canal to the station at Red Rock. It continued south and split as it neared Pendlebury Lane. The first route – the Whelley Loop which bypassed Wigan – was built to serve collieries and iron works before the loop split at De Trafford junction joining the Manchester to Southport Line just before Hindley railway station to the East and to Amberswood to the West, before re-joining the LUR at Bryn or heading further south to Warrington via the NUR. The second route headed over a viaduct, the 13 bridges which carried the railway over the River Douglas. The bridges are known locally as the dominoes due to the position and shape of the pillars and are the only parts left standing. After the viaduct the line continued to Boar's Head before connecting with the Blackpool to Liverpool Line.

References

Notes

Bibliography
Awdry, C. (1990), Encyclopaedia of British Railway Companies, Patrick Stephens Ltd, Wellingborough, .

Dewick, T. (2002), Complete Atlas of Railway Station Names, Ian Allan Publishing, .

Suggitt, G. (2003, reprinted 2004), Lost Railways of Lancashire, Countryside Books, Newbury, .
Suggitt, G. (2004), Lost Railways of Merseyside and Greater Manchester, Countryside Books, Newbury, .

External links
"Walk down memory lane", Chorley Guardian 21 June 2007, accessed 24 February 2009
Railway Images, BBC
 A Day out by Train to the Hills, BBC
Chorley to Blackburn Railway www.white-coppice.co.uk

Closed railway lines in North West England
Historic transport in Lancashire
Rail transport in Lancashire
Chorley
Transport in Blackburn with Darwen
Rail transport in Greater Manchester
History of the Metropolitan Borough of Wigan
History of St Helens, Merseyside
Transport in St Helens, Merseyside
Historic transport in Merseyside
Railway companies established in 1864
Railway lines opened in 1869
Railway companies disestablished in 1883
1864 establishments in England